Trond Peter Stamsø Munch (born November 13, 1960) is a Norwegian actor. 

He graduated from the Norwegian National Academy of Theater and has been engaged with the Trøndelag Theater since 1989. He is married to the writer and playwright Tale Næss Lysestøl.

Selected Trøndelag Theater roles
2004: An-Magritt - Jürgen Smelteknekt
2006: Berlinerpoplene - Christer
2007: King Lear - Cornwall
2007: The Wild Duck - Dr. Relling

Filmography
1983: The Pirates - Ronnie
1990: Shipwrecked - Jens
1990: Wayfarers - Edevart
1996: Offshore (TV Series) - Gunnar
2007: Brekk (Short) - Werner
2014: Out of Nature - Far
2017: 12th Man - Aslak Fossvoll

References

External links
 Trøndelag Theater: Trond Peter Stamsø Munch
 The Internet Movie Database: Trond Peter Stamsø Munch

1960 births
Living people
Oslo National Academy of the Arts alumni
Norwegian male stage actors
Norwegian male film actors
Norwegian male television actors
20th-century Norwegian male actors
21st-century Norwegian male actors